1985 Football Championship of Ukrainian SSR was the 55th season of association football competition of the Ukrainian SSR, which was part of the Soviet Second League in Zone 6. The season started on 30 March 1985.

The 1985 Football Championship of Ukrainian SSR was won by SC Tavriya Simferopol. Qualified for the interzonal playoffs, the team from Crimean Oblast did not manage to gain promotion by placing second in its group.

The "Ruby Cup" of Molod Ukrayiny newspaper (for the most scored goals) was received by SC Tavriya Simferopol.

Format
The season consisted of two stages preliminary and final tournaments. During the preliminary tournament participants were split into two groups of 14 teams in each with the seven best of each group qualifying for the championship group of the next stage and the seven worst played a consolation tournament. 

In the final stage of both championship and consolation tournaments teams played home and away only with teams of another group. The winner of championship tournament further participated in the Soviet Second League interzonal playoffs in an effort to gain promotion to the First League, while the worst team of consolation tournament relegated to amateurs.

Teams

Promoted teams
Torpedo Zaporizhia – Champion of the Fitness clubs competitions (KFK) (debut)

Relegated teams 
 Zorya Luhansk – 20th place (returning after an absence of 27 seasons)
 Tavriya Simferopol – 21st place (returning after an absence of 11 seasons)

Renamed teams 
FC Nyva Ternopil used to be located in Berezhany.

Preliminary stage

Group 1

Location map

Final standings

Group 2

Location map

Final standings

Final stage

Championship tournament

Final standings

Consolation tournament

Final standings

Top goalscorers
The following were the top ten goalscorers.

See also
 Soviet Second League

Notes

External links
 1985 Soviet Second League, Zone 6 (Ukrainian SSR football championship). Luhansk football portal
 1985 Soviet championships (all leagues) at helmsoccer.narod.ru

1985
3
Soviet
Soviet
football
Football Championship of the Ukrainian SSR